Robert Ross (2 February 1917 – 21 August 1994) was a Scottish footballer who played for Watford and Dumbarton.

References

1917 births
1994 deaths
Scottish footballers
Dumbarton F.C. players
Watford F.C. players
Scottish Football League players
English Football League players
Association football midfielders